Brahmanand may refer to:

 Swami Brahmananda (1863–1922), Ramakrishna Mission
 Brahmanand Swami, Swaminarayan Sampraday
 Brahmanand Maharaj (1859–1919), Disciple of Sri Brahmachaithanya Maharaj Gondavalekar
 Brahmanand Mandal (born 1947), Bihari politician
 Brahmanand Sankhwalkar (born 1954), Indian footballer